HMS Liberty was a  destroyer that served with the Royal Navy during the First World War. Launched on 15 September 1913 as HMS Rosalind, the ship was renamed on 30 September under an Admiralty order to become one of the first alphabetical class destroyers. On commissioning, the vessel joined the Third Destroyer Flotilla and operated as part of the Harwich Force. On 8 February 1917, the destroyer rammed and sank the German submarine . The vessel also played a minor role in the battles of Dogger Bank, Dover Strait and Jutland, as well as acting as a convoy escort and patrolling the Dover Barrage. With the cessation of hostilities, the ship was placed in reserve and sold to be broken up on 5 November 1921.

Design and development

Liberty was one of twenty-two L- or  destroyers built for the Royal Navy. The design followed the preceding  but with improved seakeeping properties and armament, including twice the number of torpedo tubes. The vessel was one of the last pre-war destroyers built by J Samuel White for the British Admiralty, constructed alongside the similar .

Two funnels were fitted. The ship's complement was 73 officers and ratings.

Armament consisted of three QF  Mk IV guns on the ship's centreline, with one on the forecastle, one aft and one between the funnels. One single  Maxim gun was carried. A single 2-pounder  "pom-pom" anti-aircraft gun was later added. Torpedo armament consisted of two twin mounts for  torpedoes mounted aft. Capacity to lay four Vickers Elia Mk.4 mines was included, but the facility was never used.

Construction and career
Liberty was laid down by J. Samuel White at East Cowes on the Isle of Wight on 31 August 1912 with the yard number 1391. The ship was launched on 15 September 1913. Originally named Rosalind in honour of the heroine of the play As You Like It, Liberty was renamed by Admiralty order on 30 September 1913. Built under the 1912–1913 Programme as part of a class named after characters in Shakespeare's plays and the Waverley novels by Sir Walter Scott, the destroyer joined what was to be the first alphabetical class, with each successive class of destroyers named after a letter of the alphabet.

On commissioning, Liberty joined the Third Destroyer Flotilla as part of the Harwich Force. After the British declaration of war and the start of the First World War on 4 August 1914, the flotilla was tasked with harassing the Imperial German Navy and on 26 August was ordered to attack German torpedo boats on their patrol as part of a large Royal Navy fleet in what was to be the Battle of Heligoland Bight. Liberty was second in the line when their pursuit brought them to the light cruiser  and almost immediately took a hit from the larger vessel that destroyed the bridge and killed the ship's commander, Nigel K. W. Barttelot. The destroyer, in turn, claimed two hits against the German ship. Damaged, the destroyer took no further part in the action, but watched as the British forces overwhelmed the German cruiser. However, at the end, after the wounded were transferred to other ships in the British fleet, Liberty was able to return to Harwich without assistance and was soon repaired.

After returning to service, the destroyer remained stationed at Harwich defending the Strait of Dover. On 23 January 1915, the destroyer led the Second Division of the Third Flotilla during the Battle of Dogger Bank. The Flotilla was incapable of keeping sufficient speed to engage in the battle, which was left to newer and faster  destroyers. The ship did, however, rescue the destroyer that led into the fray, which had been heavily damaged attacking the German armoured cruiser , towing the vessel back to Britain. For the remainder of the year, and into the next, the vessel remained at Harwich.

On 31 May 1916, as part of the Ninth Destroyer Flotilla, Liberty  was one of a small contingent from the Harwich Force that took part in the Battle of Jutland. In this case, the flotilla was in the centre of the action but again failed to engage the German battle fleet in the confusion of the battle, with Liberty failing even to spot the enemy ships. Later that year, on 26 October, the destroyer was part of a four ship flotilla sent to defend the Dover Barrage in the Battle of Dover Strait, but saw no action at the time.

The destroyer had more success on 8 February the following year. While patrolling the Barrage, shortly after 03:00, Liberty spotted the German minelaying submarine  surface ahead. The German vessel sank with no survivors. In addition to these actions, Liberty was also deployed as an occasional convoy escort. The ship was subsequently redeployed to the Fourth Destroyer Flotilla based at Devonport.

After the Armistice of 11 November 1918 that ended the war, the Royal Navy returned to a peacetime level of strength and both the number of ships and the amount of personnel needed to be reduced to save money. Liberty was initially placed in reserve at the Nore alongside over sixty other destroyers. On 5 November 1921, the vessel was sold and broken up for scrap.

Pennant numbers

References

Citations

Bibliography

 
 
 
 
 
 
 
 
 

 
 
 
 
 
 
 
 
 

1913 ships
Liberty
Ships built on the Isle of Wight
Liberty